Cymdeithas y Dysgwyr, better known as CYD, is a movement that offers social opportunities to bring Welsh learners and speakers together so that Welsh learners can improve their oral skills in the language and get a deeper understanding of Welsh culture.

This can happen

 at the local branch level
 by branches joining together to arrange area activities
 by joining national activities such as the quiz, residential weekends, etc.

One of its founders and the current honorary president is Professor Bobi Jones, a renowned Welsh scholar.

External links 
 CYD website
 MYD website

Welsh language
Education in Wales